Baele is a Belgian surname. Notable people by that name include:

 Etienne Baele (1891–1975), chief of staff of the Belgian army.
 Philippe Baele (born 1951), Belgian anaesthesiologist.
 Walter Baele (born 1964), Flemish cabaretier and actor.

Belgian culture